The Manning House is a historic house in Andover, Massachusetts.  It was built c. 1760 for Hezekiah Ballard, a local farmer.  Ballard sold the property to Thomas Manning, a cordwainer, in 1771, and it has been in the Manning family ever since.  The main block of the house is a -story colonial structure with a gambrel roof, which is rare in Andover for the period.  Its main entrance is into a projected central vestibule, and there are a series of additions added to the back of the house.

The house was listed on the National Register of Historic Places in 1982.

See also
National Register of Historic Places listings in Andover, Massachusetts
National Register of Historic Places listings in Essex County, Massachusetts

References

Houses in Andover, Massachusetts
National Register of Historic Places in Andover, Massachusetts
Houses on the National Register of Historic Places in Essex County, Massachusetts
Georgian architecture in Massachusetts